Rengao is a North Bahnaric language. It is spoken in parts of south and central Vietnam.

References

Languages of Vietnam
Bahnaric languages